Nesolestes pauliani is a species of damselfly in the family Megapodagrionidae. It is endemic to Comoros.

References

Insects of the Comoros
Megapodagrionidae
Endemic fauna of the Comoros
Insects described in 1951
Taxonomy articles created by Polbot